José Luis Medina Lizalde (born 26 December 1951) is a Mexican politician affiliated with the Party Morena . As of 2014, he served as Deputy of the LIX Legislature of the Mexican Congress as a plurinominal representative...

References

1951 births
Living people
People from Zacatecas
Members of the Chamber of Deputies (Mexico)
Party of the Democratic Revolution politicians
Deputies of the LIX Legislature of Mexico